The 1954 Temple Owls football team was an American football team that represented Temple University as an independent during the 1954 college football season. In its sixth and final season under head coach Albert Kawal, the team compiled a 3–5 record.  The team played its home games at Temple Stadium in Philadelphia.

Schedule

References

Temple
Temple Owls football seasons
Temple Owls football